Rose and Alex Pilibos Armenian School is a K-12 Armenian school in the neighborhood of Little Armenia in Los Angeles, California. It was founded by Alex and Rose Pilibos in 1969. History and religion classes are taught in the Armenian language, and the rest of the classes are taught in English. The school is part of St. Garabed Armenian Apostolic Church.

Notable alumni 
Serj Tankian, Daron Malakian and Shavo Odadjian of System of a Down attended the school at different times during the 1970s and '80s
Sarah Leah Whitson, director of the Middle East and North Africa division of Human Rights Watch.

Academics 
The Rose and Alex Pilibos Armenian school, one of several academic institutions under the auspices of the Western Prelacy of the Armenian Apostolic Church of America, is a college-oriented school accredited by the Western Association of Schools and Colleges (WASC).

The school offers advanced placement and honors courses, as well as courses certified by the Regents of the University of California. Students at Rose and Alex Pilibos Armenian School are required to maintain a minimum academic standard (delineated below) in order to remain in the student body.

New Students 

Incoming students from other institutions must fulfill the following requirements in order to be accepted to the middle and high school.

A minimum GPA of 2.0 for the last academic year at the former school.
Satisfactory performances on a grade-level English language test administered by the school.
No history of major disciplinary infractions. Probation Policy If, at the end of the semester, a 
Students failing to meet any aspect of the criteria delineated above will be placed on academic probation during the following semester. The student's probationary status will be fully explained to the parents. After the second semester, students failing to achieve the minimum academic criteria required by the school and if retention or other alternatives are deemed inappropriate will not be readmitted to the school.

Programs

Athletics  

Pilibos is a member of CIF (California Interscholastic Federation).

Pilibos offers training and teams in basketball, soccer, volleyball, and track at the elementary, junior high, and high school levels. The school participates with other Armenian schools in the annual KAHAM games, organized by Homenetmen and in various inter-school tournaments with other Armenian and non-Armenian schools.

Arts 

The Rose and Alex Pilibos Art Department provides the opportunity for its Kindergarten to 12th grade students to involve themselves with theatre arts, photography, drawing, sculpting, design, painting, videography, advertising, and many other mediums of expression. The intention of the art program is to continuously develop while introducing creative approaches, perspectives, and techniques to their students.

Elementary school 
Students in each grade take one music class, one performing arts class, and one visual arts class. Some of the various forms of art students are exposed to are:

Drawing
Painting
Collage
Design
Sculpting
Photography
Theatre
Music
Script writing
Art history
Armenian History

Middle School  

 Theatre Arts
 Creative Writing
 Speech & Debate
 Design Work 6
 Design Works 7
 Design Works 8

High School  

 AP Studio Arts
 Visual and Performing Arts

Technology  
At the start of the 2012 – 2013 Academic Year, Pilibos aims to increase the presence and usage of technology in the classrooms to aid in the day to day lessons, more progressive and innovative projects, and collaborative work among students.

Elementary school 

 Keyboarding
 Input/Output Devices
 Graphic Application

Middle school 

 Animation
 Digital Media
 Google Docs
 Programming
 File Management
 Video Game Design
 Web/Graphic Design
 Microsoft Office Suites
 Online Collaborative Tools
 Digital Imaging/Photography
 Digital Citizenship & Acceptable Use Policy
 E-mail & Electronic Communication Etiquette

High school 

 Robotics
 Engineering

Extra-Curricular

Students Clubs  

Some of the various student organized clubs at Pilibos are:

Armenian Club
Book Club
Chess Club
Creative Writing Club
Entrepreneur Club
Environmental Club
Make A Wish Club
My Artsakh Club
Philanthropy Club
Publications' Club
Rhythm and Poetry Club
Stand Up To Cancer Club

Student Academic Organizations  

 JSA
 Mock Trial
 Model UN
 Academic Pentathlon
 Academic Decathlon

Competitions  

Students at Pilibos are also encouraged to participate in various academic competitions. These include:

Spelling Bee
Geography Bee
Armenian Quiz Bowl
Science Quiz Bowl
LA County Science Fair
CA State Science Fair
Academic Pentathlon 
Academic Decathlon
Mock Trial
Model United Nations
Junior State of America

Community Service  

The high school curriculum requires that students fulfill 100 hours of community service.

Students participate in various community service activities and organizations, such as:

Vaghoohas Library Project
Armenia Orphanage
Hospitals
Counselor In Training
Political/Election Offices
Armenian National Committee of America
Armenian Youth Federation

Gallery

See also
 History of the Armenian Americans in Los Angeles

References

External links
Official page of school

Educational institutions established in 1969
Armenian-American culture in Los Angeles
Armenian-American private schools
High schools in Los Angeles
Private K-12 schools in Los Angeles County, California
1969 establishments in California